The 2016 Mumbai City FC season was the club's third season since its establishment in 2014 and their third season in the Indian Super League, their most successful till date. This season was also the first in which the club was coached by the Costarican Alexandre Guimarães, replacing Nicolas Anelka who served as player-coach the previous season. They finished first in the standings after the ending of the league season, qualifying for the semifinals for the very first time led by Diego Forlán who was their marquee player. However they lost in the semifinals to Atletico de Kolkata 1-5 on aggregate.

Background

After the end of the 2014 ISL season, Mumbai City parted ways with their inaugural season head coach, Peter Reid. Soon after, Nicolas Anelka, the club's marquee from 2014, was named as the player-head coach for the 2015 season. The season began for Mumbai City with a 3–1 loss to their Maharashtra rivals, Pune City on 5 October. The team ended the season with only four wins through fourteen matches, three of which came in a row at the end of October. This resulted in Mumbai City finishing the season in sixth place in the standings, missing out on the finals by six points.

Player movement

Foreign players

Indian players
To be Announced

Signings

Squad information

First team squad

Coaching Staff

Indian Super League

Results summary

Matches

Knockout phase
In the knockout phase, teams played against each other over two legs on a home-and-away basis, except for the one-match final.

Semi-finals

Player statistics

List of squad players, including number of appearances by competition

|}

See also
 2016–17 in Indian football

References

External links

Mumbai City FC seasons
Mumbai